Rebecca Cleary (née Wakim; born 5 August 1972) is a former Australian rugby union player. She made her test debut for Australia against the Black Ferns in 1996 in Sydney. She represented Australia at the 1998 and 2002 Rugby World Cup's.

In 2000, Cleary played for the Lady Waratahs team against the Auckland Storm in a Super 12 curtain raiser at Eden Park.

References 

1972 births
Living people
Australian female rugby union players
Australia women's international rugby union players